The Thompson's Loss and Gain Site is a colonial-era historic site near Rehoboth Beach in Sussex County, Delaware.  It is an archaeological site encompassing a tenant farm that was in active use from about 1720 to 1780.  The site includes the site of a house, root cellar, and well.  It was listed on the National Register of Historic Places in 1978.

See also
National Register of Historic Places listings in Sussex County, Delaware

References

Archaeological sites on the National Register of Historic Places in Delaware
National Register of Historic Places in Sussex County, Delaware
Farms on the National Register of Historic Places in Delaware
1720s establishments in Delaware